Edward Verdun McHugh (1916-1982) was an Australian rugby league player who played in 1940s.

McHugh came to St. George from the Carlton Athletics JRLFC  and was graded in 1942. He played three seasons with St. George between 1942 and 1944. McHugh played centre in the 1942 Grand Final for St George. War duties and a knee injury curtailed his rugby league career during this time, and he announced his retirement in 1945.

References

St. George Dragons players
Australian rugby league players
1916 births
1982 deaths
Rugby league centres
Rugby league fullbacks
Rugby league players from Sydney
Australian military personnel of World War II